This is a list of live professional wrestling events held by the American Professional wrestling promotion Impact Wrestling and seen exclusively on Twitch.

2018

Brace for IMPACT (2018)

Brace for IMPACT was a professional wrestling event produced by Impact Wrestling in conjunction with Wrestlepro to be released exclusively on Impact Wrestling's Twitch channel.

Last Chancery

Last Chancery was a professional wrestling event produced by Impact Wrestling in conjunction with Border City Wrestling to be released exclusively on Impact Wrestling's Twitch channel.

Impact Wrestling vs. Lucha Underground

Impact Wrestling vs. Lucha Underground was a professional wrestling event produced by Impact Wrestling in conjunction with Lucha Underground to be released exclusively on Impact Wrestling's Twitch channel.

Penta Does Iowa

Penta Does Iowa was a professional wrestling event produced by Impact Wrestling in conjunction with The Wrestling Revolver to be released exclusively on Impact Wrestling's Twitch channel.

RISE of the Knockouts

RISE of the Knockouts was a professional wrestling event produced by Impact Wrestling in conjunction with Rise Wrestling to be released exclusively on Impact Wrestling's Twitch channel.

Confrontation

Confrontation was a professional wrestling event produced by Impact Wrestling in conjunction with America's Most Liked Wrestling to be released exclusively on Impact Wrestling's Twitch channel.

Uncivil War

Uncivil War was a professional wrestling event produced by Impact Wrestling in conjunction with Next Generation Wrestling to be released exclusively on Impact Wrestling's Twitch channel.

Impact Wrestling vs. UK

Impact Wrestling vs. UK was a professional wrestling event produced by Impact Wrestling to be released exclusively on Impact Wrestling's Twitch channel.

Ohio vs. Everything

Ohio Versus Everything was a professional wrestling event produced by Impact Wrestling to be released exclusively on Impact Wrestling's Twitch channel.

2019

Battle of Brooklyn

Battle of Brooklyn was a professional wrestling event produced by Impact Wrestling to be released exclusively on Impact Wrestling's Twitch channel.

Brace for IMPACT (2019)

Brace for IMPACT was a professional wrestling event produced by Impact Wrestling to be released exclusively on Impact Wrestling's Twitch channel.

Opening Day

Opening Day was a professional wrestling event produced by Impact Wrestling to be released exclusively on Impact Wrestling's Twitch channel.

Salute to the Troops

Salute for the Troops was a professional wrestling event produced by Impact Wrestling to be released exclusively on Impact Wrestling's Twitch channel.

References 

Impact Wrestling
Twitch (service)
2018 in professional wrestling
2019 in professional wrestling
2020 in professional wrestling